Thanacha Sooksod (born 26 May 2000 in Suphan Buri) is a Thai indoor volleyball player. She is a member of the Thailand women's national volleyball team.

Career
In 2018 she joined senior national volleyball team.

Clubs
  Supreme Chonburi (2018–2019)
  PFU BlueCats (2019–2020)
  Supreme Chonburi (2020)
  Diamond Food (2020–2022)
  Okayama Seagulls (2022–)

Awards

Individuals
 2018 U19 Asian Championship – "Best Outside Spiker"
 2019 VTV Binh Dien Cup – "Best Opposite Spiker"

Club
 2018–19 Thailand League –  Runner-up, with Supreme Chonburi
 2019 Thai–Denmark Super League –  Champion, with Supreme Chonburi
 2019 Asian Club Championship –  Runner-up, with Supreme Chonburi

References

2000 births
Living people
Thanacha Sooksod
Expatriate volleyball players in Japan
Thanacha Sooksod
Thanacha Sooksod
PFU BlueCats players
Thai expatriate sportspeople in Japan
Thanacha Sooksod